Franz Musil (11 July 1899 – 10 March 1961) was an Austrian footballer. He played in two matches for the Austria national football team from 1925 to 1926.

References

External links
 

1899 births
1961 deaths
Austrian footballers
Austria international footballers
Place of birth missing
Association footballers not categorized by position

1. Simmeringer SC players